Claudio Borghi may refer to:

 Claudio Borghi (footballer) (born 1964), Argentine football manager and former player  
 Claudio Borghi (politician) (born 1970), Italian politician